The Serpent Queen is an American period drama television series about the life of Catherine de' Medici, the 16th century Queen of France, as portrayed by actress Samantha Morton. The series was created by Justin Haythe and is based on the 2004 nonfiction book Catherine de Medici: Renaissance Queen of France by Leonie Frieda. The Serpent Queen premiered on Starz network on September 11, 2022. Starz renewed the series for a second season on October 27, 2022.

Plot
The series follows the story of Catherine de' Medici, who marries into the French Valois court as a fourteen year-old teenager expected to bring in a fortune in dowry and produce heirs. Despite many challenges, a lifetime of clever political maneuvering allows her to rule France as queen for 30 years.

Cast and characters

Main

 Samantha Morton as Catherine de' Medici, Queen of France
 Liv Hill as the younger Catherine, Duchessina of Urbino
 Amrita Acharia as Aabis, a Romani woman who is part of young Catherine's entourage
 Barry Atsma as Montmorency, a member of King Francis's privy council
 Enzo Cilenti as Cosimo Ruggeri, an Italian fortune teller brought to France by Catherine
 Sennia Nanua as Rahima, Catherine's new maid
 Kiruna Stamell as Mathilde, Catherine's dwarf maid
 Nicholas Burns as Antoine de Bourbon, elder son of Charles de Bourbon
 Beth Goddard as Antoinette de Guise, Claude's wife and the mother of Francois and Charles
 Raza Jaffrey as Francois, Duc de Guise, elder son of Claude de Guise
 Danny Kirrane as Louis de Bourbon, Antoine's younger brother
 Ray Panthaki as Charles, Cardinal de Guise, the Duc de Guise's younger brother

Recurring

 Ludivine Sagnier as Diane de Poitiers, Henri's older mistress
 Paul Chahidi as Charles de Bourbon, another member of the privy council
 Navid Negahban as Claude, Duke de Guise, the third member of the privy council
 Ruby Bentall as Angelica, daughter of a famed perfumier who accompanies Catherine to France
 Naomi Battrick as Anne d'Etampes, one of King Francis's mistresses
 Colm Meaney as King Francis
 Rebecca Gethings as Queen Eleanor
 Gemma Dobson as Nathalie, a kitchen servant
 Antonia Clarke as Mary, Queen of Scots
 Lee Ingleby as Henri II
 Alex Heath as the younger Henri, the Duke of Orleans and second son of King Francis, who marries Catherine
 George Jaques as Francis II, Catherine's eldest son by Henri
 Steve Furst as Dr. Fernel
 Jade Croot as Emily, a Protestant girl protected by Montmorency

Guest
 Louis Landau as Dauphin François, King Francis's firstborn son
 Charles Dance as Pope Clement VII
 Adam Garcia as Sebastio, young Catherine's atelier
 Memet Ali Alabora as Sultan Suleiman
 Anna Cottis as Cook
 David Denman as Pierre Marques
 Katie Haigh Mayet as Geraldine Marques, Pierre's wife
 Jordan Bigot and Yngve Sanchez Beuthe as Charles IX, Catherine's second son by Henri
 Rupert Everett as Charles V, Holy Roman Emperor
 Nicolas Robin as Gabriel de Lorges, Count of Montgomery

Episodes

Production

Development 
In February 2021, Starz granted an eight episode series based upon the book Catherine de Medici: Renaissance Queen of France by Leonie Frieda, with Justin Haythe set to serve as a writer and executive producer, with Francis Lawrence and Erwin Stoff also set to executive produce. Stacie Passon will direct multiple episodes of the series, including the pilot. Production companies involved in the series were slated to consist of Lionsgate Television and 3 Arts Entertainment. Starz renewed the series for a second season on October 27, 2022.

Casting
In April 2021, Samantha Morton joined the cast as Catherine de' Medici. In May 2021, Amrita Acharia, Enzo Cilenti, Barry Atsma, Nicholas Burns and Danny Kirrane joined the cast in starring roles, while Charles Dance, Ludivine Sagnier, Liv Hill, Kiruna Stamell, and Colm Meaney in recurring capacity. In June 2021, Ray Panthaki joined the cast of the series. In August 2021, it was announced Raza Jaffrey, Sennia Nanua, Beth Goddard and Alex Heath had joined the cast of the series, in undisclosed, starring and recurring capacities, respectively.

Filming
Principal photography of the first season began in April 2021 in Marseille and in the Loire Valley in France and in the Papal Palace in Italy.

Music

Release 
The Serpent Queen premiered on Starz on September 11, 2022.

Reception 
On the review aggregator website Rotten Tomatoes, 100% of 19 critics' reviews are positive, with an average rating of 7.7/10. The website's consensus reads, "The Serpent Queen dramatizes one of history's most infamous monarchs with a deft, sardonic touch, with Samantha Morton's commanding star turn likely to swallow viewers' attention whole." Metacritic, which uses a weighted average, assigned a score of 76 out of 100 based on 12 critics, indicating "generally favorable reviews".

References

External links
 

2020s American drama television series
2022 American television series debuts
English-language television shows
Cultural depictions of Catherine de' Medici
Starz original programming
House of Medici
Television series by 3 Arts Entertainment
Television series by Lionsgate Television
Television shows based on non-fiction books
Television shows set in France
Films set in the 16th century